Shinfield is a village and civil parish in the English county of Berkshire, just south of Reading. It contains  and is administered by the unitary authority of Wokingham District. Shinfield Park is the northern part of the parish, becoming physically separated from Reading when the M4 motorway was constructed in 1971.

Geography
The parish includes the roadside hamlets of Ryeish Green, Spencers Wood, Three Mile Cross, Shinfield Village and Grazeley and the southern portion of the suburb of Reading called Shinfield Rise. It is surrounded on its eastern and southern boundary by the River Loddon. The M4 motorway runs west–east through the northern portion of the parish, near the former Berkshire County Council's Shire Hall, now the offices of the John Wood Group; the part to the north of the M4 corresponds closely with the part known as Shinfield Park.

The main road through the village, running north–south, is the former A327, running between Reading and Aldershot, with the A327 now bypassing the village centre. Shinfield Village is centred on the village green (School Green), surrounded by a pub, a shop, the village school and recreation grounds. Its residential housing has increased considerably during the first years of the 21st century. The parish consists of a central ridge of high land sloping down to the river Loddon on the east and the Kennet Valley on the west. The soil is mostly London Clay, with patchy spreads of valley and plateau gravel.

Government
As well as being part of the District of Wokingham, Shinfield is governed by a parish council consisting of fifteen parish councillors, assisted by two full-time administrative staff and several part-time caretaking and maintenance employees. Shinfield has been part of the Hundred of Charlton since before the Norman Conquest. Hundreds effectively ceased to function after 1886. Between 1894 and 1974, it was in the Wokingham Rural District. There are many manors and supposed manors in the parish: Shinfield, Hartley Dummer alias Arbor, Hartley Battle, Hartley Amys, Hartley Pellitot, Moor Place, Diddenham Court, Hartley Court and Garston. Hartley Dummer is in the hundred of Theale. The Diddenham estate was officially a detached part of Wiltshire until transferred to Berkshire in 1844.

History
The village was named Shining Field, by the Anglo-Saxons, after the sparkling flood-waters which still often cover the meadows down by the Loddon on the Arborfield border. The manor was one of the many owned by Catherine of Aragon in Tudor times. She is said to have stayed there on occasion, possibly while visiting Reading Abbey. During the Civil War, King Charles is said to have stayed at Goodrest House (now part of Crosfields School). Later, the local church tower was blown to pieces by Parliamentary soldiers trying to oust a group of Royalists who were hiding out there. The fine brick replacement can still be seen today. The church is the last resting place of the parents of author Mary Russell Mitford.  RAF Shinfield Park was located in the north of the Parish and was the home of RAF Flying Training Command from 1940 until 1968. It then became the home of the Meteorological Office College from 1971 until 2002. The European Centre for Medium-Range Weather Forecasts (ECMWF) remains on the site though the rest has been converted to residential housing. The Cattle Breeding Centre operated at Shinfield from 1943 to 1991.

Transport

Relief road
The Shinfield Eastern Relief Road opened on 31 October 2017.  It serves the Shinfield Campus of the University of Reading's Thames Valley Science Park.

Bus services
Shinfield is served by the following bus routes:
 3, Reading - Arborfield- Wokingham
 10, Reading - Spencers Wood
 10a, Reading - Thames Valley Science Park

Institutions

Churches
The Church of England parish church of St. Mary is in Church Lane on the west side of the village.
Shinfield Baptist Church is on Hollow Lane (the main north-south route through the village and formerly the A327)

Schools

Alder Grove CofE Primary School 
Shinfield Infants & Nursery School – built by Richard Piggott in 1707
Shinfield St Mary's CoE Junior School
Whiteknights Primary School
Crosfields Independent Day School – centred on the early 17th century Goodrest House
Oakbank School
Ryeish Green School (Defunct)

Sport and leisure

Shinfield Players Theatre, 
Shinfield Tennis Club, Millworth Lane, Shinfield.
Shinfield Cricket Club, Millworth Lane. Shinfield.
The Shinfield Shambles Border Morris & The Kennet Morris Men
There are play areas & recreation grounds in Kendal Avenue, Millworth Lane and at Frensham Green and Pearman's Copse
Pound Green WI and Shinfield Mothers' Union
Shinfield & District History Society
Spencers Wood Library

Notable residents
Shinfield is the current home of Glenn Little (Wrexham FC), Jem Karacan (Reading FC) and Brynjar Gunnarsson (Reading FC).
Spencers Wood in the parish was the former home of Lenny Henry and Dawn French.

References

External links

Shinfield Parish Council
Royal Berkshire History: Shinfield

Villages in Berkshire
Borough of Wokingham
Civil parishes in Berkshire